Charles Mack may refer to:

 Charles Mack (blackface performer) (1888–1934), blackface minstrel show performer
 Charles Emmett Mack (1900–1927), American film actor
 Charles Mack (songwriter), Oscar-nominated writer of Raise It Up (August Rush song)
 Charles R. Mack, American art historian